Barsedth is a district (srok) in the south of Kampong Speu Province, in southern Cambodia. The district capital is the town of Barsedth located some 50 kilometres south of the provincial capital of Kampong Speu by road. The district shares a border with Kampot and Takeo provinces to the south.  National Highway 3 forms the eastern district boundary. The district is made up of flat farmland and supports extensive agriculture and a large population.

The district has significant road infrastructure and National Highway 3 which runs from Phnom Penh to Veal Rinh runs along the eastern edge of the district from north to south. Borsedth District is one of the smaller districts in Kampong Speu province by land area but has one of the largest district populations in the province due to well irrigated land and good transport infrastructure. National Road 124 crosses the district, entering from the north and exiting in the south to join National Highway 3 further south in Dang Tong district of Kampot Province. Numerous smaller tertiary roads cross the district running either north to Kong Pisei and then to the provincial capital or east toward National Highway 3.

Dam rehabilitation 
Borsedth district is the site of a 2-year climate change project funded by the Global Environment Facility (GEF). The project will rehabilitate several dams in Borsedth and neighbouring Samraong district of Takeo. The dams are vital for rice production and water supply for families in the two districts. The total project cost over two years is 2.5 million U.S. dollars.

Location 
Borsedth district lies in the south of the province and shares a border with Kampot and Takeo provinces. Reading from the north clockwise, Basedth borders with Samraong Tong district to the north. To the north east is Kong Pisei district. The eastern border of the district is shared with Samraong District of Takeo province. To the south the district shares a border with Tram Kak district of Takeo. The western border of the district joins with Phnom Sruoch district of Kampong Speu.

Administration
Borsedth District is subdivided into 15 communes (khum) and 218 villages (phum) The Basedth district governor reports to Korng Heang, the Governor of Kampong Speu. The following table shows the villages of Basedth district by commune.

Demographics 
According to the 1998 Census, the population of the district was 108,648 persons in 21,288 households in 1998. This population consisted of 51,175 males (47.1%) and 57,473 females (52.9%). With a population of over 100,000 people, Basedth has the second largest district population in Kampong Speu province. Only Samraong Tong is larger. The average household size in Basedth is 5.1 persons per household, which is slightly lower than the rural average for Cambodia (5.2 persons). The sex ratio in the district is 89.0%, with significantly more females than males.

References

Districts of Kampong Speu province